John L. Brash (born 1937) is a Canadian chemical engineer, having been Distinguished University Professor at McMaster University. One of his students, Heather Sheardown, is now a professor at McMaster.

Awards 

 Society of Biomaterials Founders Award 
 Canadian Society for Chemical Engineering R.S. Jane Memorial Award
 Canadian Biomaterials Society Lifetime Achievement Award

References

Academic staff of McMaster University
Canadian chemical engineers
Living people
1937 births